Adán Aquilino Godoy Rubina (born 26 November 1936) is a Chilean former footballer who played as a goalkeeper for Chile in the 1962 and 1966 FIFA World Cups. He also played for Santiago Morning and Club Deportivo Universidad Católica.

Personal life
He is the father-in-law of the former Chile international footballer Carlos Rivas, with whom he coincided in Santiago Morning in 1977, at the same time he is the grandfather of the Canadian former footballer Carlos Rivas Jr., son of Carlos Sr.

References

External links
FIFA profile
Adán Godoy at PartidosdeLaRoja 

1936 births
Living people
People from Copiapó
Chilean footballers
Chile international footballers
Association football goalkeepers
Colo-Colo footballers
Santiago Morning footballers
Club Deportivo Universidad Católica footballers
Audax Italiano footballers
Chilean Primera División players
Primera B de Chile players
1962 FIFA World Cup players
1966 FIFA World Cup players